Mufulira, is a town in the Copperbelt Province of Zambia. Mufulira means "Place of Abundance and Peace". The town developed around the Mufulira Copper Mine in the 1930s. The town also serves as the administrative capital of Mufulira District.

Location

A shorter, less well-maintained road (the M4 Road) exists and measures .

Mufulira is connected to the Mokambo Border and eventually the Luapula Province of Zambia by the Congo Pedicle road. The section from Mufulira to Mokambo is designated as the M5 Road while the route through the Congo Pedicle to the Chembe Border is named the Congo Pedicle road.

The geographical coordinates of Mufulira are:12°32'08.0"S, 28°14'31.0"E (Latitude:-12.535556; Longitude:28.241944).

Overview
The town of Mufulira developed around the Mufulira Copper Mine in the 1930s. A branch of Zambia Railways, carrying freight only, serves the mine. Mufulira is the south-western end of the Congo Pedicle road connecting the Copperbelt Province to the Luapula Province, making that province Mufulira's commercial hinterland.

Population
In 1990, the population of Mufulira was 123,936 people. In 2000, there were 122,336 people. The 2010 population census and household survey enumerated the population of the town at 151,309 inhabitants. The table below illustrates the same data in tabular format.

Economy
The Mufulira Copper Smelter was rehabilitated by SMEC South Africa. Production and employment levels went down from the 1969 peak when the Copperbelt made Zambia the world's 4th largest copper producer.

Sports
In Zambia, Mufulira is well known for being the home of the successful Mufulira Wanderers F.C., a  professional soccer club.

Notable people
Abe Bekker, boxer, lived here
Kalusha Bwalya, national soccer player and African Footballer of the Year winner, in 1988, was born here.
Frederick Jacob Titus Chiluba (1943–2011), who served as the second president of Zambia, from 1991 until 2001, lived in Mufulira in the 1960s.
Robert Earnshaw, soccer player
Mike Harris, racing driver who competed in the 1962 South African Grand Prix.
Dafydd James, international rugby player
Simon Mwansa Kapwepwe (1922–1980), who served as Vice President of Zambia from 1967 until 1970. He served as member of parliament for Mufulira West Constituency from December 1971 until February 1972, under the UPP political party, the only UPP MP elected.
Christopher Katongo, soccer player
Felix Katongo, soccer player
Kenneth Kaunda (born 1924), the founder President of Zambia, in office from 1964 until 1991. In 1948, he served as a teacher and boarding master at Mufulira Upper School.
Robert John "Mutt" Lange, songwriter and record producer
Levy Patrick Mwanawasa (1948–2008), who served as President of Zambia from 2001 until 2008, was born in Mufulira.
Samuel "Zoom" Ndhlovu, soccer player and Zambia Soccer Team coach
Stevie Vann, singer
Kåre Becker

See also
 Mopani Copper Mines
 Copperbelt Province including the history of copper mining in Zambia

References

External links
 Malachite Plant Extension in Mufulira
https://www.britannica.com/place/Mufulira
https://www.zambia-info.org/country/town/1340/mufulira
https://www.mindat.org/loc-4345.html
https://www.airbnb.com/mufulira-zambia/stays

Mufulira District
Populated places established in the 1930s
Populated places in Copperbelt Province